Hope Floats is a 1998 American drama film directed by Forest Whitaker and starring Sandra Bullock, Harry Connick Jr., and Gena Rowlands.

Written by Steven Rogers and Brandine Spuckler, the story follows Birdee (Bullock), an unassuming housewife whose life is disrupted when her husband (Michael Paré) reveals his infidelity to her on a Ricki Lake-style talk show. Birdee and her daughter Bernice (Mae Whitman) go to live with her mother (Rowlands) in the small town where Birdee grew up, where everyone knows of her televised marital collapse. Meanwhile, she meets an old friend named Justin (Connick Jr.) and instantly sparks a romance. While Justin's intentions are clear and good, Birdee struggles with the decision to unequivocally accept him in her life.

The film made its release on May 29, 1998 and was distributed by 20th Century Fox.

Plot
Birdee Pruitt is a Chicago housewife who is invited onto the national Toni Post talk show under the pretense of getting a free makeover. Instead, she is ambushed with the revelation that her husband Bill has been having an affair with her best friend Connie.

Humiliated, Birdee and her precocious daughter Bernice move back to Birdee's hometown of Smithville, Texas, with her eccentric mother Ramona and her young, imaginative nephew Travis. As Birdee and Bernice leave Chicago, Birdee gives Bernice a letter from Bill, telling her how much he misses her.

Birdee struggles to make a new life as a working single mother and deals with the growing attraction between herself and a former high school classmate, Justin Matisse, who Ramona hopes that Birdee will get together with. She also tries to rebuild her relationship with her estranged mother, her father (who has Alzheimer's disease), and Bernice. 

Bernice desperately wants to be with her father and attempts to sabotage the romantic overtures Justin makes towards Birdee. Meanwhile, she is also struggling to adjust to her new life and school in Smithville.

Adding to Birdee's heartache is her former status as the school queen bee and beauty pageant winner who dismissively alienated many of her classmates. They remember Birdee's high school snobbery and rub her nose in her televised embarrassment.

Ramona tries to mend the gap between her daughter and granddaughter by telling a story about her childhood. She then asks Bernice what she wants for her upcoming birthday. Even though Bernice says she does not have a birthday wish, she secretly wishes for her father to return.

Ramona suffers a massive heart attack and dies. Birdee's sister and Travis's mother, Desiree, sends a telegram that she cannot make the funeral. Meanwhile, Travis wonders if his aunt Birdee will raise him now. When Bill arrives at the funeral, Bernice believes that her wish has come true and that her father wants them both to come home.

However, it soon becomes clear to Bernice that her parents' split is permanent when Bill asks Birdee for a divorce. Wanting to be with her father, she runs to her room, packs a suitcase, and follows Bill to his car. Bernice is heartbroken and devastated when he tells her that even though he loves her and promises to come back for her, he has no room for her in his new life with Connie right now. Bill drives off, leaving Bernice sobbing and screaming for him to come back and take her with him.

Birdee picks Bernice up, carrying her back into the house. As Birdee comforts her, she says she knows the letter was actually written by her mother, and not really by him.

One day at work, Birdee finds Justin outside waiting for her with flowers. As she walks to him, she says, "Ok, Mama, stop pushing." After they kiss and embrace, he picks her up, places her in his truck and they drive off.

The final scene shows Birdee, Justin, Bernice, and Travis at a big town event. It is shown that Birdee has taken full custody of Travis and is also dating Justin, but is not planning on getting married again for a really long time. Bernice embraces Smithville as her new hometown, ultimately accepts Bill's departure from her life, and has warmed up to Justin as her mother's new love interest and a father figure.

The mother and daughter share a tender, yet humorous moment when Bernice asks if Birdee plans to marry Justin. When Birdee asks her if she does not like him, she says her only real concern is being known as "Bernice Matisse".

Cast

Filming
The home in the movie is the McCollum-Chapman-Trousdale House, built in the Neoclassical style in 1908. The elementary school in the movie is a 1924 high school building.  The church used was Saints Peter and Paul Church in Kovar, Texas, about 6 miles from Smithville. The church was built in 1921.

The film was choreographed by Patsy Swayze.

Soundtrack

The film's soundtrack, released in 1998 and produced by Don Was, featured well-known artists such as Garth Brooks, the Rolling Stones, Bryan Adams, Bob Seger, and Sheryl Crow. Brooks' "To Make You Feel My Love", was a number one single on the Billboard country singles charts in August 1998 and also a Grammy Award nominee in 1999 for Male Country Vocal performance.

Hope Floats: Original Score Soundtrack 
 
 "To Make You Feel My Love" (written by Bob Dylan) – Garth Brooks (3:53)
 "In Need" – Sheryl Crow (5:29)
 "Honest I Do" (written by Jimmy Reed) – The Rolling Stones (3:55)
 "Chances Are" – Bob Seger and Martina McBride (4:17)
 "All I Get" – The Mavericks (4:08)
 "Paper Wings" – Gillian Welch (3:57)
 "Stop! In the Name of Love" – Jonell Mosser with David Campbell (4:31)
 "Wither, I'm a Flower" – Whiskeytown (4:53)
 "What Makes You Stay" – Deana Carter (4:35)
 "To Get Me to You" – Lila McCann (3:50)
 "Smile" – Lyle Lovett with David Campbell (3:38)
 "When You Love Someone" – Bryan Adams (3:39)
 "To Make You Feel My Love" (written by Bob Dylan) – Trisha Yearwood (2:57)

Reception

Critical response
On review aggregator Rotten Tomatoes, the film holds an approval rating of 26%, based on 34 reviews, with an average rating of 4.9/10. The site's consensus states: "Hope Floats sinks under a deluge of melodramatic turns and syrupy sentimentality, although Sandra Bullock remains a winning star."

Mick LaSalle of the San Francisco Chronicle called it "corny and false, with a script by Steven Rogers that's almost 100 percent artificial sweetener." He praised the performances of Sandra Bullock and Dee Hennigan, especially in the scene at the employment agency, and said Harry Connick Jr. was "likable as usual", but found the character Bernice's surliness to be abnormal and painful to watch. Roger Ebert deemed it "a turgid melodrama with the emotional range of a sympathy card", citing the formulaic plot and numerous holes in the characterizations. He gave it two stars. James Berardinelli also gave it two stars, commenting that the film relies too much on stock situations and blatantly calculated attempts to stir emotion while neglecting character-building. He also criticized the acting, saying that Bullock is better suited to more lighthearted fare, and Connick's performance is wooden. The Republicans John R. McEwen had a more mixed reaction, assessing the film as "a run-of-the-mill romance, but fair work by all involved." He particularly praised the chemistry between Connick and Bullock and the country-flavored soundtrack. However, he criticized that the townspeople's callousness towards Birdie strains credulity, since Bullock's performance makes it hard to imagine people disliking her so much, and that even if they did it would be normal for them to have some sympathy after her public humiliation and the breakup of her marriage.

Awards and nominations 
 1999 ALMA Awards
 Nomination: Outstanding Performance of a Song for a Feature Film - The Mavericks for the song "All I Get".
 1999 Acapulco Black Film Festival
 Nomination: Best Director - Forest Whitaker
 1999 Blockbuster Entertainment Awards
 Nomination: Favorite Actor - Drama/Romance - Harry Connick Jr.
 Nomination: Favorite Supporting Actress - Drama/Romance - Gena Rowlands
 1999 Lone Star Film & Television Awards
 Winner: Best Actress - Sandra Bullock
 Winner: Best Supporting Actress - Gena Rowlands
 1999 Young Artist Awards
 Winner: Best Performance in a Feature Film - Young Actress Age Ten or Under - Mae Whitman
 Nomination: Performance in a Feature Film - Young Actor Age Ten or Under - Cameron Finley
 1998 YoungStar Awards
 Nomination: Best Performance by a Young Actor in a Drama Film - Cameron Finley
 Nomination: Best Performance by a Young Actress in a Drama Film - Mae Whitman
 1998 Stinkers Bad Movie Awards
 Nomination: Most Annoying Fake Accent - Sandra Bullock

References

External links
 
 
 
 

1998 films
1998 drama films
20th Century Fox films
American drama films
Country music films
Films directed by Forest Whitaker
Films produced by Lynda Obst
Films scored by Dave Grusin
Films set in Texas
Films shot in Texas
1990s English-language films
1990s American films